Ignatovo is a rural locality (a village) in Kiprevskoye Rural Settlement, Kirzhachsky District, Vladimir Oblast, Russia. The population was 4 as of 2010. There is 1 street.

Geography 
Ignatovo is located 30 km east of Kirzhach (the district's administrative centre) by road. Fetinovo is the nearest rural locality.

References 

Rural localities in Kirzhachsky District